WMRP-LP (104.7 FM) is a Christian country formatted broadcast radio station licensed to Mundy Township, Michigan, serving the Mundy Township/Grand Blanc area.  WMRP-LP is owned and operated by SWC Concerts, Inc.

History
WMRP-LP went on the air in March 2008, but its call sign dates back to 1946, when the now WWCK, used it as part of its MOR format and as a broadcast "arm" of the United Methodist Church, from which the station gets its call sign meaning.

In 1964, WMRP would spawn an FM station, known as WMRP-FM, which today is WWCK-FM.

Neither of the two stations has any other relation to today's WMRP-LP 104.7 than this.

In January 2011, WMRP-LP 104.7 changed from adult contemporary Christian music as "Ark 104.7" to a Christian country format. It is one of three such radio stations in Michigan as of May 2015.

External links
 

MRP-LP
Radio stations established in 2008
2008 establishments in Michigan
MRP-LP